The 2001–02 NBA season was the Bucks' 34th season in the National Basketball Association. During the off-season, the Bucks signed free agent Anthony Mason to shore up their front line. After advancing to the Eastern Conference Finals last year, the Bucks got off to a solid start winning nine of their first ten games, but then lost five straight afterwards. The team posted an 8-game winning streak in January, which led them to a division-leading record of 26–13 as of January 21, and held a 28–18 record at the All-Star break. At midseason, the team signed free agent Greg Anthony, who was previously released by the Chicago Bulls. However, with a 35–25 record as of March 6, the Bucks would struggle and proceed to lose 16 of their final 22 games and miss the playoffs, finishing fifth in the Central Division with a 41–41 record, thanks to an embarrassing 123–89 road loss to the Detroit Pistons to close out the season. This was one of the biggest late-season collapses for a team that was contending for a Division title in March.

Ray Allen averaged 21.8 points and 1.3 steals per game, and was selected for the 2002 NBA All-Star Game. In addition, Glenn Robinson averaged 20.7 points, 6.2 rebounds and 1.5 steals per game, while Sam Cassell provided the team with 19.7 points and 6.7 assists per game, and Mason contributed 9.6 points, 7.9 rebounds and 4.2 assists per game. Off the bench, sixth man Tim Thomas averaged 11.7 points per game, and second-year guard Michael Redd showed improvement averaging 11.4 points per game. Following the season, Robinson was traded to the Atlanta Hawks after eight seasons in Milwaukee, while Darvin Ham signed as a free agent with the Hawks, and Anthony retired.

For the season, the team slightly changed their uniforms by adding side panels to their jerseys. The uniforms would remain in use until 2006.

Draft picks

Roster

Regular season

Season standings

c – clinched home field advantage throughout conference playoffs
y – clinched division title
x – clinched playoff spot

Record vs. opponents

Game log

|-style="background:#bbffbb;"
| 1 || October 30, 2001 || @ Utah
| W 119—112
|
|
|
| Delta Center18,845
| 1–0

|-style="background:#bbffbb;"
| 2 || November 1, 2001 || @ Denver
| W 102—101
|
|
|
| Pepsi Center18,634
| 2–0
|-style="background:#bbffbb;"
| 3 || November 3, 2001 || Boston
| W 105–99
|
|
|
| Bradley Center18,171
| 3–0
|-style="background:#bbffbb;"
| 4 || November 8, 2001 || Miami
| W 86–82
|
|
|
| Bradley Center18,364
| 4–0
|-style="background:#fcc;"
| 5 || November 10, 2001 || Minnesota
| L 82–98
|
|
|
| Bradley Center18,717
| 4–1
|-style="background:#bbffbb;"
| 6 || November 14, 2001 || @ Washington
| W 107–98
|
|
|
| MCI Center20,674
| 5–1
|-style="background:#bbffbb;"
| 7 || November 17, 2001 || Utah
| W 104–93
|
|
|
| Bradley Center18,717
| 6–1
|-style="background:#bbffbb;"
| 8 || November 21, 2001 || Chicago
| W 95–79
|
|
|
| Bradley Center18,717
| 7–1
|-style="background:#bbffbb;"
| 9 || November 22, 2001 || @ Toronto
| W 107–98
|
|
|
| Air Canada Centre19,800
| 8–1
|-style="background:#bbffbb;"
| 10 || November 21, 2001 || Atlanta
| W 95–88
|
|
|
| Bradley Center18,717
| 9–1
|-style="background:#fcc;"
| 11 || November 27, 2001 || @ L. A. Lakers
| L 85–104
|
|
|
| STAPLES Center18,997
| 9–2
|-style="background:#fcc;"
| 12 || November 28, 2001 || @ Phoenix
| L 84–104
|
|
|
| America West Arena15,590
| 9–3
|-style="background:#fcc;"
| 13 || November 30, 2001 || @ Portland
| L 95–101
|
|
|
| Rose Garden18,723
| 9–4

|-style="background:#fcc;"
| 14 || December 2, 2001 || @ Seattle
| L 83–97
|
|
|
| Key Arena13,595
| 9–5
|-style="background:#fcc;"
| 15 || December 4, 2001 || New York
| L 71–85
|
|
|
| Bradley Center17,416
| 9–6
|-style="background:#bbffbb;"
| 16 || December 6, 2001 || Toronto
| W 95–89
|
|
|
| Bradley Center18,717
| 10–6
|-style="background:#bbffbb;"
| 17 || December 8, 2001 || New Jersey
| W 95–79
|
|
|
| Bradley Center18,171
| 11–6
|-style="background:#fcc;"
| 22 || December 20, 2001 || @ Dallas
| W 101—113
|
|
|
| American Airlines Center19,780
| 14–8
|-style="background:#fcc;"
| 23 || December 22, 2001 || @ Houston
| W 110—115
|
|
|
| Compaq Center11,628
| 14–9

|-style="background:#fcc;"
| 40 || January 22, 2002 || Phoenix
| L 81–92
|
|
|
| Bradley Center17,036
| 26–14
|-style="background:#fcc;"
| 41 || January 24, 2002 || Seattle
| L 88–99
|
|
|
| Bradley Center16,659
| 26–15

|-style="background:#bbffbb;"
| 46 || February 7, 2002 || Memphis
| W 107–103
|
|
|
| Bradley Center17,726
| 28–18

|-style="background:#fcc;"
| 65 || March 18, 2002 || @ Charlotte
| L 110—113
|
|
|
| Charlotte Coliseum7,883
| 36–29
|-style="background:#fcc;"
| 69 || March 26, 2002 || Dallas
| L 106–112 OT
|
|
|
| Bradley Center18,465
| 37–32

Player statistics

Awards and records

Transactions

Trades

Free agents

Player Transactions Citation:

References

See also
 2001–02 NBA season

Milwaukee Bucks seasons
Milwaukee Bucks
Milwaukee Bucks
Milwaukee